Villu Kangur (born 27 November 1957 in Pärnu) is an Estonian actor, poet, translator and scenarist.

1982-1992 he worked at Estonian State Youth Theatre. 1993-2002 he was an editor at the newspaper Eesti Ekspress.

He has written song texts, libretos and screenwritings for musicals, operas and films.

In 2018 he was awarded with Order of the White Star, V class.

Filmography
 1993 "Salmonid" (television series; scenarist)
 2005 "Hajameelselt abielus" (television series; scenarist)	
 2010, 2019 "ENSV" (television series; scenarist; role: doctor)
 2014 "A ja B" (television series; scenarist) 	
 2015 "Mustad lesed" (television series; role )
 2018 "Põrgu Jaan" (feature film; role: Jakub)

References

Living people
1957 births
Estonian male television actors
Estonian male film actors
Estonian male stage actors
20th-century Estonian male actors
21st-century Estonian male actors
Estonian screenwriters
Estonian translators
Estonian songwriters
Estonian male poets
20th-century Estonian poets
21st-century Estonian poets
Recipients of the Order of the White Star, 5th Class
People from Pärnu